The mining industry of Mali is dominated by gold extraction which has given it the ranking as the third largest in Africa. Artisanal miners play a large part in the mining of diamonds. The other minerals extracted are rock salt and  semiprecious stones. Phosphates are mined in the Tilemsi Valley. In 2013, gold exports were of the order of 67.4 tonnes, nearly a 50% increase over the production in 2012 which is attributed mainly to the contribution of 20.7 tonnes made by artisanal mining. Gold, followed by cotton, is the top export item making a large contribution to the economy of the country.

History
Gold extraction has occurred in Mali from ancient times using simple implements before the modern mechanized system came into practice. This activity is traced to the days of monarchy of the Islamic emperors in the country when salt and gold were major Trans-Saharan trade commodities from Timbuktu and Djenné. In 2007, it was reported that women and men in approximately equal proportions are associated with artisanal mining.

Production and impact
Apart from gold, which is the main sources of the economy of the country, diamond is also extracted from Kéniéba region ( away from Bamako) and many more prospected kimberlite pipes with diamondiferous are yet to be put into production stage. Phosphate is mined from the Tilemsi Valley, but to a limited extent. Other established mineral resources are: Bauxite reserves of 1.1 billion tons from three locations between Kéniéba and Bamako; iron ore reserves of 146 million tons of 50% Fe grade, mostly from Ble; and manganese reserve of 10 million tons at Asongo.

Semi precious stones extracted are amethyst, epidote, garnet, prehnite, and quartz. Some amount of diamond is also extracted as a byproduct during gold extraction. Gold mining is carried out by 13 international mining companies.

Legal framework
Mining laws in the country are based on the French legal framework. The laws and regulations in force are: Mining Code: Ordinance N° 91 – 065 / P-CTSP of 19 September 1991; Regulations : Decree N° 91 – 277/PM-RM of 19 September 1991; and Decree No. 91-278/PM-RM of 19 September 1991 for u issuing licences. Convention d'Etablissement, Autorisation de Prospection, Permis de Recherche, and Permis d'exploitation  are the normative formats used for signing of agreements with foreign companies at different stages starting from exploration to extraction. The mining permit is issued for a maximum period of 30 years.

Commodities
There is both industrial and artisanal mining operations at the Sadiola, Morila, and Yatéla mines. Since the 1990s, artisan mined gold has been obtained from alluvial deposits of Kéniéba, Syama, the Tabakoto, and the Kalana underground gold mine. These mines have contributed about 65 tonnes of auriferous minerals towards the economy of the country.
 
The United States Geological Survey estimates that Mali has 200,000 tons of lithium resources.

See also

Geology of Mali
Eburnean orogeny
Kenieba inlier
Bambouk

References

External links

Mining in Mali
Economy of Mali
Mali